Miles James "Deuce" McBride (born September 8, 2000) is an American professional basketball player for the New York Knicks of the National Basketball Association (NBA). He played college basketball for the West Virginia Mountaineers.

High school career
McBride was a two-sport athlete at Moeller High School in Cincinnati, Ohio, playing basketball and football as a quarterback. He played alongside teammate Jaxson Hayes from 2015 to 2018. As a sophomore, he averaged 10.5 points, 2.5 assists, and 1.8 steals per game for the Division I state runners-up in basketball. He suffered a season-ending left foot injury during a football game as a junior. McBride was sidelined from all but the final two games of the basketball season and helped Moeller win the Division I state title. He opted out of playing football in his senior season to focus on basketball. As a senior, McBride averaged 13.8 points, 5.3 rebounds and 4.1 assists per game, leading Moeller to a 29–0 record and another Division I state championship. His team achieved the first undefeated season in its division since 1995. A three-star recruit, he committed to playing college basketball for West Virginia.

College career
On November 8, 2019, McBride made his debut for West Virginia, recording 11 points, six rebounds, four assists and four steals in a 94–84 win over Akron. On December 29, he scored 21 points in a 67–59 win against Ohio State. On January 11, 2020, McBride scored a freshman season-high 22 points in a 66–54 victory over Texas Tech. As a freshman, McBride averaged 9.5 points and 2.4 rebounds per game while shooting 40.2 percent from the field, mostly coming off the bench. He was named to the Big 12 All-Freshman Team. 

In his sophomore season debut on November 25, 2020, McBride scored 23 points in a 79–71 win over South Dakota State. On February 6, 2021, he posted 29 points, eight assists and seven rebounds in a 91–79 win against Kansas. In the first round of the NCAA tournament, McBride recorded a career-high 30 points, six rebounds and six assists in an 84–67 victory over Morehead State. As a sophomore, he averaged 15.9 points, 4.8 assists, 3.9 rebounds and 1.9 steals per game, earning Second Team All-Big 12 honors. On April 2, McBride declared for the 2021 NBA draft while maintaining his college eligibility. He later decided to remain in the draft, foregoing his college eligibility.

Professional career

New York Knicks (2021–present)
McBride was selected in the second round of the 2021 NBA draft with the 36th pick by the Oklahoma City Thunder and then traded to the New York Knicks. On August 6, 2021, the Knicks announced that they had signed McBride. Through the 2021 NBA Summer League, McBride averaged 15.1 points, 3.5 rebounds, 3.5 assists, and 1.9 steals per game. He made his regular season debut on October 24, 2021. On February 1, 2022, McBride was assigned to the Westchester Knicks, and he scored 39 points in a 117-107 win over the Delaware Blue Coats.

Career statistics

NBA

|-
| style="text-align:left;"|
| style="text-align:left;"|New York
| 40 || 2 || 9.3 || .296 || .250 || .667 || 1.1 || 1.0 || .4 || .0 || 2.2
|- class="sortbottom"
| style="text-align:center;" colspan="2"|Career
| 40 || 2 || 9.3 || .296 || .250 || .667 || 1.1 || 1.0 || .4 || .0 || 2.2

College

|-
| style="text-align:left;"|2019–20
| style="text-align:left;"|West Virginia
| 31 || 2 || 22.2 || .402 || .304 || .747 || 2.4 || 1.8 || 1.1 || .5 || 9.5
|-
| style="text-align:left;"|2020–21
| style="text-align:left;"|West Virginia
| 29 || 28 || 34.2 || .431 || .414 || .813 || 3.9 || 4.8 || 1.9 || .3 || 15.9
|- class="sortbottom"
| style="text-align:center;" colspan="2"|Career
| 60 || 30 || 28.0 || .419 || .368 || .785 || 3.1 || 3.3 || 1.5 || .4 || 12.6

Personal life
McBride is the son of Walt and Kim McBride. His father played basketball for Xavier, while his mother played tennis for Ohio State. McBride's older brother, Trey, is playing basketball for the Itzehoe Eagles in Germany. He has been nicknamed "Deuce" since he was in third grade.

References

External links

 West Virginia Mountaineers bio

2000 births
Living people
American men's basketball players
Basketball players from Cincinnati
New York Knicks players
Oklahoma City Thunder draft picks
Point guards
Westchester Knicks players
West Virginia Mountaineers men's basketball players